Mohanganj is an upazila of Netrokona District in the Mymensingh division of Bangladesh. It is one of the 10 upazilas of Netrakona district. Mohanganj is largely known as the capital of Lower Bangladesh as it is the economic heart of Lower Bangladesh generally known as Haor.

Geography
It has 24011 households and a total area of 243.2 km2. The Upazila is bounded by Barhatta Upazilas and Sunamganj district on the north, Khaliajuri and Sunamganj  district on the east, Madan Upazila on the south and Atpara Upazila on the west.

Mohanganj is a true example of riverine Bangladesh. This part of Bangladesh is beautified by the famous Kangsha River which is also the backbone of transportation and economic system. Except this, numerous canals, small rivers crisscrossed that land and established itself as an important Upazila of rural Bangladesh.

Demographics
According to 2011 Bangladesh census, Mohanganj had a population of 167,507. Males constituted 50.28% of the population and females 49.72%. Muslims formed 84.09% of the population, Hindus 15.82%, Christians 0.05% and others 0.03%. Mohanganj had a literacy rate of 42.13% for the population 7 years and above.

As of the 1991 Bangladesh census, Mohanganj had a population of 129415. Males constituted 51.4% of the population, and females 48.6%. Upazila's 18+ population was 65417. Mohanganj had an average literacy rate of 64.73%, and the national average of 72.89% literate according to 2017 data.

Points of interest
There is an ancient fort at the village Betham (Sultan Alauddin Hussain Shah period), Sheikh Bari Mosque (same period), and Daulatpur Temple (876 BS).

Economy
Agriculture 48.25%, fishing 2.62%, agricultural laborer 21.21%, wage laborer 2.53%, commerce 9.84%, service 3.49% and others 12.06%.

Fertile land 24864.43 hectares, fallow land 390.84 hectares; single crop 52%, double crop 38% and treble crop land 10%; land under irrigation 71%.

Administration
Mohanganj Thana, now an upazila, was formed on 6 April 1920.

Mohanganj Upazila is divided into Mohanganj Municipality and seven union parishads: Barkashia Birampur, Baratali Banihari, Gaglajur, Maghan Siadhar, Samaj Sahialdeo, Suair, and Tentulia. The union parishads are subdivided into 111 mauzas and 163 villages.

Mohanganj Municipality is subdivided into 9 wards and 18 mahallas.

Transport
Mohanganj Upazila has a strong waterway connection with Sylhet, Sunamganj, Bhairab Bazar and Dhaka. Alongside, the road network system connected it with Netrokona, Mymensingh and to the capital, Dhaka. There is two intercity train now running from Dhaka to Mohanganj. Haor express departs at 11:50pm from kamlapur railway station and Mohanganj express departs Dhaka at 2:20 
pm. Visiting Tanguar Haor through this route is also a good option other than the popular Sunamganj route.

Gallery

See also
 Upazilas of Bangladesh
 Districts of Bangladesh
 Divisions of Bangladesh

References

Upazilas of Netrokona District